This is an alphabetical list of songs written or co–written by the American singer–songwriter Phil Vassar.

"Song" – Artist (co-writers)

0–9

A
"Ain't Nothin' Like It" – Neal McCoy (Charlie Black, Tommy Rocco)
"Amazing Grace" – Phil Vassar (Craig Wiseman)
"American Child" – Phil Vassar (Craig Wiseman)
"Around Here Somewhere" – Phil Vassar (Charlie Black, Tommy Rocco)
"Athens Grease" – Phil Vassar (Steve Mandile, Jerry Vandiver)

B
"Baby Rocks" – Phil Vassar (Jeffrey E. Smith, Billy Alcorn)
"Baby You're Right" – Phil Vassar (Brett James)
"Black and Whites" – Phil Vassar (Craig Wiseman)
"Bobbi with an I" – Phil Vassar (Craig Wiseman)
"Boston" – Kenny Chesney (Kenny Chesney, Mark Tamburino)
"Bye, Bye" – Jo Dee Messina (Rory Bourke)

C
"Carlene" – Phil Vassar (Charlie Black, Rory Bourke)
"Crazy Life" – Phil Vassar

D
"Dancin' with Dreams" – Phil Vassar (Charlie Black, Bobby Fischer)
"Didn't You Know She's Gone" – Phil Vassar (Don Sampson)
"Don't Speak" – Mindy McCready (Steve Mandile, Julie Wood)
"Drive Away" – Sons of the Desert, Phil Vassar (Charlie Black)

E
"Erase" – Phil Vassar (Julie Wood)
"Everywhere I Go" – Phil Vassar (Jeffrey Steele)

F
"For a Little While" – Tim McGraw (Steve Mandile, Jerry Vandiver)
"For the First Time" – Kenny Chesney (Kenny Chesney)
"Forgettin's So Long" – Phil Vassar (Robert Byrne)

G
"God Bless This Town" – Marshall Dyllon (Rory Bourke)
"Gone by Dawn" –Jennifer Day, Phil Vassar (Julie Wood, Robert Byrne)
"Good Ole Days" – Phil Vassar (Craig Wiseman)

H
"Here to Forget" – Phil Vassar (Billy Alcorn, Jeff Smith)
"Houston" – Phil Vassar (Julie Vassar)

I
"I Miss the Innocence" – Phil Vassar (Julie Wood, Jeff Wood)
"I Thought I Never Would Forget" – Phil Vassar (Tim Nichols)
"I Was" – Neal McCoy (Charlie Black)
"I Would" – Phil Vassar
"I'll Be the One" – Phil Vassar (Julie Wood, Jeff Wood)
"I'm Already Gone" – Diamond Rio, Phil Vassar (Annie Roboff)
"I'm Alright" – Jo Dee Messina
"In a Real Love" – Phil Vassar (Craig Wiseman)
"Island Boy" – Kenny Chesney (Kenny Chesney, Mark Tamburino)
"It's a Beautiful Life" – Kenny Rogers (Charlie Black, Jim Collins)
"It's Only Love" – Phil Vassar (Rodney Clawson, Julie Wood)

J
"Joe & Rosalita" – Phil Vassar (Charlie Black)
"Just Another Day in Paradise" – Phil Vassar (Craig Wiseman)
" Just a Blur in the Rearview" (Robbin Thompson)

K

L
"Little Red Rodeo" – Collin Raye (Charlie Black, Rory Bourke)
"Last Day of My Life" – Phil Vassar (Tim Ryan Rouillier)
"Let Me Love You Tonight" – Phil Vassar (Jeffrey E. Smith, Julie Wood)
"Like I Never Loved Before" – Phil Vassar (Robert Byrne)
"Live It Up" – Marshall Dyllon (Robert Byrne)
"Lucky as Me" – Phil Vassar (Robert Byrne)

M
"Mary Go 'Round" – Skip Ewing (Skip Ewing)
"My Chevrolet" – Phil Vassar (Billy Alcorn, Tim Ryan Rouillier)
"My Next Thirty Years" – Tim McGraw

N
"Nobody Knows Me Like You" – Phil Vassar (Julie Wood) Jeffrey Smith

O
"Once in a While" – Engelbert Humperdinck (Richard Williamson)

P
"Postmarked Birmingham" – Blackhawk (Don Sampson)
"Prayer of a Common Man" – Phil Vassar (Tom Douglas)

Q

R
"Right on the Money" – Alan Jackson (Charlie Black)
"Rose Bouquet" – Phil Vassar (Robert Byrne)

S
"Six-Pack Summer" – Phil Vassar (Charlie Black, Tommy Rocco)
"Someone You Love" – (Rob Thomas)
"Somewhere In Between" – Phil Vassar (Julie Wood)
Sound of a Million Dreams- David Nail (Scooter Carusoe)
"Stand Still" – Phil Vassar (Connie Harrington, Julie Wood)

T
"That's When I Love You" – Phil Vassar (Julie Wood)
"This Is God" – Phil Vassar
"This Is My Life" – Phil Vassar (Tom Douglas)
"This Is Where The End Starts" – Phil Vassar (Haley Vassar)
"Time's Wastin'" – Phil Vassar (Fred Miles)
"Twenty One" – Phil Vassar (Tim Nichols)

U
"Ultimate Love" – Phil Vassar (Rodney Clawson, Julie Wood)

V

W
"Why We Walk" - featured with the book Why We Walk
"Wishing Well" – Jo Dee Messina, Jessica Andrews (Annie Roboff)
"The Woman in My Life" – Phil Vassar (Julie Wood)
"The World Is a Mess" – Phil Vassar (Tom Douglas)
"Words Are Your Wheels" – various artists (Julie Wood)

X

Y
"Yeah Right" – Jennifer Day (Robert Byrne, Julie Wood)

Z

Lists of songs by songwriters